Mother India is an acclaimed 1957 Indian Hindi film epic.

Mother India may also refer to:
Bharat Mata, the national personification of India
Mother India (book), a controversial 1927 book about India by Katherine Mayo
Mother India (magazine), an Indian spiritual magazine published since 1949
Mother India (1938 film), a Bollywood film of the 1930s
Mother India (1992 film), a 1992 Telugu film starring Sharada